Sinocephale (meaning "Chinese head") is a genus of pachycephalosaurid dinosaur that lived in Inner Mongolia, China during the Cretaceous period. The only species, Sinocephale bexelli, was originally named as a species of the genus Troodon in 1953, and later transferred to the genus Stegoceras. After decades of being considered dubious, it was re-evaluated in 2021 and recognized as a valid taxon, being given a unique generic name. The original holotype was lost, with modern research conducted using rediscovered plaster casts. Scant material makes for limited knowledge of its life appearance, but it is distinguished by an embayment on the back of the domed skull, which would give it a heart shape as seen from above. It is potentially the oldest known pachycephalosaurid and falls within the subset of the family called Pachycephalosaurinae, related to animals such as Stegoceras. The geologic context of the species has been historically unclear but it is currently thought to originate in rocks belonging to the Ulansuhai Formation.

Discovery and naming

During the early 20th century, Swedish palaeontological expeditions were conducted in China; during one such expedition, sometime in 1930 or 1931, a specimen was discovered that would become recognized as the first evidence of Pachycephalosauria from Asia. It consisted of a parietal bone, largely complete along its midline and right side but missing part of the left. Discovered at the Tsondolien-Khuduk geologic locality in Inner Mongolia, the specimen among others were brought to Sweden for study in Uppsala. The specimen was named and described by palaeontologist Birger Bohlin in 1953, as a new species of the genus Troodon, with the specific name T. bexelli, in honour of Gerhard Bexel, who discovered the specimen. The genus Troodon had historically been considered a pachycephalosaur rather than a theropod as is recognized today. By the time the paper had been published the specimen had already been returned to China's Institute of Vertebrate Paleontology and Paleoanthropology; sometime subsequent to this return the specimen among with many others were lost. A decade later in 1964 Oskar Kuhn reassigned T. bexelli to the genus Stegoceras as the species S. bexelli.

Bohlin's species was largely ignored in the years subsequent to its original naming, only occasionally invoked to mention its significance as the first known Asian pachycephalosaur. In 1983 Hans-Dieter Sues and Peter Galton commented on the species in a paper focused on North American pachycephalosaurs, noting that based on the data from Bohlin's description the species clearly differs from definite Stegoceras material, casting doubt on its assignment to the genus. They considered the material to clearly be indeterminate and unidentifiable as a valid taxon below the family level. Robert M. Sullivan would agree with this sentiment in later papers, noting it likely belonged to Asian genus like Prenocephale but that it should be considered an undiagnostic nomen dubium. In her chapter on pachycephalosaurs in the 1990 book The Dinosauria, Teresa Maryańska offered an alternative opinion, noting points of anatomical distinctiveness compared to other pachycephalosaurids despite the scant nature of its material. She noted it would be worthwhile for the material to be re-examined and given its own genus.

Further research became possible with the recognition of two plaster casts of the holotype. One is located at the American Museum of Natural History under the specimen number AMNH 2073, and the other at the Museum of Evolution of Uppsala University under the specimen number PMU  23186, with the former having a tag indicating its origination in Uppsala. These are thought to have been made by Eric Ingemar Ståhl during the original period of study, before the return of the original specimen to China. These were used as plastotypes for the species, meaning they function as stand-ins for the holotype (which was never given a specimen number) due to it being lost; the holotype remains the name-bearing specimen and is not considered replaced. In light of this discovery palaeontologist David Evans and colleagues redescribed the species; they noted that, based on how the specimen had been discussed in the literature, they were potentially the first people since Bohlin to study the anatomy firsthand instead of merely basing opinions off of the 1953 paper. They aimed to provide a more in-depth description than the 1953 study, investigating the ornamentation and age of the animal and evaluating its phylogenetic place in the Pachycephalosauridae in light of the decades of discoveries since its naming. Finding the specimen to be a diagnostic, distinct species within the family, they gave it a new genus name, Sinocephale. The prefix refers to China, where the specimen was found, and the suffix -cephale means "head" and is a common suffix for pachycephalosaur names.

There have been multiple interpretations of the geologic providence the Tsondolien-Khuduk locality where the holotype was found. Bohlin thought that the species "is at least not older than the North American forms", referring to taxa such as Stegoceras, though noted the geology was likely not deposited at the exact same time. In 1974 Maryańska and Halszka Osmólska tentatively favored the idea that Tsondelien-Khuduk was equivalent in age to the Djadochta Formation, which they considered Coniacian or Santonian in age. They noted this would make it the oldest known pachycephalosaur from Asia, with others then otherwise only known from the later Barun Goyot and Nemegt Formations. The Djadochta Formation is now considered more recent than it was at the time, dating to the mid Campanian age. Sues and Galton considered the stratigraphic placement of the Tsondolien-Khuduk locality uncertain, but noted it may be older than Djadochta rather than equivalent. They stated it was located in the Kansu region of China. In The Dinosauria David Weishampel ascribed the rocks to the Minhe Formation, something followed by later authors. The redescription noted both of these were in error; the specimen is from Nei Mongol (Inner Mongolia), not Kansu, and so cannot be from Minhe. Through interpretation of the 1953 paper, map analysis, and firsthand understanding of the area by You Hailu (one of the four authors of the paper), they concluded that Sinocephale hails from the Ulansuhai Formation. The age of this formation is not constrained with confidence; it is definitely younger than the Cenomanian and is most likely Turonian in age. This makes Sinocephale the oldest known pachycephalosaurid genus in the world, making it older than Acrotholus by at least 8 million years.

Description

Pachycephalosaurs were small bipedal animals bearing thickened skulls with a dome shape on their tops. This would have given the skull a roughly heart-shaped profile when seen from above. Beyond this, a unique combination of traits variously found in other species also contributes to distinguishing the taxon. The parietal is widely exposed on the back of the head, differing from taxa like Stegoceras and Prenocephale which have large  enclosing the parietal, and being similar to the condition seen in Foraminacephale and some species of Sphaerotholus. Unlike other taxa sharing this condition, however, it is lacking in prominent ornamentation along this parieto-squamosal shelf. Instead, ornamentation on the back of the skull seems to have been restricted to smooth, small irregular bumps and rugosities, which are common among pachycephalosaurs. Its parietal anatomy is overall an intermediate half-step between the straight morphology seen in Stegoceras and kin as opposed to more derived genera like Sphaerotholus with rounded shapes. On the front margin of the parietal, its connection to the  bone is also documented, with a thick undulating line of contact between the two bones. Though the apex of the skull is not preserved, the thickness of the preserved portion indicates the presence of a dome similar to other pachycephalosaurs. The temporal chamber is large and noticeably arched when viewed from the side. The only known specimen is hypothesized to constitute a subadult or adult, but with only plaster casts to study, this conclusion is tentative.

Classification

 

The taxon has been recognized as a member of the Pachycephalosauridae ever since its initial description in 1953, when the group was still known as Troodontidae. The 2021 redescription was the first time Sinocephale was tested in a phylogenetic analysis; this analysis was modified from that of Woodruff et al. (2021), which itself is derived from that of Evans et al. 2013. S. bexelli was able to be coded for 18% of the anatomical traits considered by the analysis. It was found that the species belonged to the Pachycephalosaurinae. This makes it quite distantly related to Stegoceras, despite its association with the genus historically, instead being related to animals like Prenocephale. It was cautioned, however, that the support for its phylogenetic position was not robust, and so subject to change. The phylogenetic tree of Evans et al. (2021) is reproduced below:

References

Late Cretaceous dinosaurs of Asia
Pachycephalosaurs
Fossil taxa described in 2021
Paleontology in China
Turonian genus first appearances
Turonian genus extinctions
Ornithischian genera